Franklin High School is a public high school in Franklin, Wisconsin. There are 1,573 students enrolled as of the 2021–2022 school year. Its mascot is the saber-toothed tiger, and the school colors are black and gold.

Student body

Demographics
 American Indian/Alaskan Native - 0.5%
 Asian - 11%
 Black - 3%
 Hawaiian Native/Pacific Islander - 0.1%
 Hispanic - 6%
 White - 79%
 Two or more races - 0.1%
 Total minority enrollment - 21%

Gender
 Male - 52%
 Female - 48%

Economically disadvantaged students
 Free lunch program - 13%
 Reduced lunch program - 2%
 Total economically disadvantaged - 15%

Extra-curricular activities

Athletics
Franklin High School athletic teams compete in the Southeast Conference of the WIAA.  The baseball team competes in the Greater Metro Conference. All sports compete in Division 1 athletics.

State championships
 Baseball: 2010, 2011
 Football: 2006, 2021
 Girls' gymnastics: 2011, 2012, 2013, 2014, 2016, 2017
 Dance: 2007, 2008, 2009, 2010, 2011, 2012, 2013, 2014, 2016, 2017, 2018, 2019, 2020
 Boys' track and field: 1969
 Girls' track and field: 2014
 Chess team: 2014

Notable alumni

Sean McGuire, pro football
Evan Kruczynski, pro baseball

References

External links

Schools in Milwaukee County, Wisconsin
Public high schools in Wisconsin
1962 establishments in Wisconsin